Real Sporting de Gijón Promesas was a Spanish football club based in Gijón, in the autonomous community of Asturias, that acted as the second reserve team of Sporting de Gijón.

History
Founded in 1975 as the club's second reserve team, it competed until 1981 achieving two promotions in its two first seasons.

Season to season

Source

References

External links
Real Sporting Official website

Sporting de Gijón
Defunct football clubs in Asturias
Association football clubs established in 1975
Association football clubs disestablished in 1981
1975 establishments in Spain
1981 disestablishments in Spain